Retinal correspondence is the inherent relationship between paired retinal visual cells in the two eyes. Images from one object stimulate both cells, which transmit the information to the brain, permitting a single visual impression localized in the same direction in space.

Types

Normal retinal correspondence (NRC) is a binocular condition in which both foveas work together as corresponding retinal points, with resultant images fused in the occipital cortex of the brain.

Abnormal retinal correspondence (ARC), also called Anomalous retinal correspondence  is binocular sensory adaptation to compensate for a long-standing eye deviation (i.e. strabismus). The fovea of the straight (non-deviated) eye and non-foveal retinal point of the deviated eye work together, sometimes permitting single binocular vision.

See also
Bagolini Striated Glasses Test
Binocular vision
Haploscope
Stereopsis
Orthoptist

References

External links
 Bhola, Rahul. Binocular Vision. University of Iowa Department of Ophthalmology & Visual Sciences: EyeRounds.org. January 23, 2006.
 International Orthoptics Association
 Orthoptics Association of Australia

Vision